The Chonta mountain range (possibly from Aymara chunta prolonged, lengthened, Quechua chunta a kind of palm,) lies in the Huancavelica Region in the Andes of Peru. It extends between 12°37' and 13°07'S and  75°00' and 75°30'W for about 50 km. It is located in the Castrovirreyna Province and in the Huancavelica Province.

Mountains 
Some of the highest mountains in the range are listed below:

 Tanranu,  
 T'uruyuq,  
 Palumu, 
 Wamanrasu, 
 Sitaq,   
 Hatun Pata,  
 Huch'uy Anqas,  
 Antarasu,   
 Qarwarasu,  
 Puka Punta, 
 Wallu Q'asa,  
 Pinqullu,  
 Sukullu,  
 Kunturay (Condoray),  
 Pata Pata,  
 Qarwa Q'asa,  
 Anqasqucha,  
 Chuntarahu (Chontaraju),  
 Ch'aqra Punta,  
 Ichhu Rutuna, 
 Kachi Mach'ay Urqu, 
 Kunkayuq,  
 K'allapayuq,  
 Puka Rumi, 
 Qarwa K'anti, 
 Qusqu, 
 Q'iru Pinqullu, 
 Wachu Intiyuq,  
 Wamanripayuq,  
 Wari,  
 Wayra Q'asa,   
 Winchu Q'asa, 
 Yana Urqu (Cast.),  
 Yana Urqu (Huanc.),  
 Yarq'asqa,   
 Yawar Q'asa, 
 Awqa Urqu,  
 Yana Pampa, 
 Aqchi, 
 Atuq Marka, 
 Kuntur Wamani, 
 Kuntur Wamani (Castr.), 
 Pinqullu, 
 Phiruru Urqu, 
 Puka Q'asa (Cast.-Huan.), 
 Puka Q'asa (Huan.), 
 Qalla Qalla, 
 Q'ara Wayuna, 
 Taruja Marka, 
 Waqutuyuq, 
 Yuraq Mach'ay, 
 Wayta Urqu, 
 Qarwa Urqu, 
 Tuku Wasi, 
 Ukhu P'ukru, 
 Pichqa Pukyu,

References

Mountain ranges of Peru
Mountain ranges of Huancavelica Region